Dina Sanichar (1860 or 1861–1895) was a feral boy. Sanichar was discovered by a group of hunters among wolves in a cave in Bulandshahr, Uttar Pradesh, India in February 1867, at the age of around six. Sanichar was taken to Sikandra Mission Orphanage where he was given the name "Sanichar" because he arrived on a Saturday. When he arrived at the orphanage, he reportedly walked on all fours and ate raw meat. While he could not speak, he would make sounds similar to a wolf. He went on to live among other humans for over twenty years but never learned to speak and remained seriously impaired his entire life. Sanichar was a heavy smoker. He died of tuberculosis in 1895.

References

1895 deaths
1860s births
Feral children
19th-century Indian people
Indian people with disabilities
19th-century deaths from tuberculosis
Tuberculosis deaths in India